The Charles C. Fitch Farmstead is a historic farm property located in Eugene, Oregon. It was listed as a historic district on the National Register of Historic Places (NRHP) on June 16, 1989.

Description and history
The property nominated for listing on the NRHP is the remaining  of Charles Fitch's 1902  farmstead. It constitutes the functional center of the farming operation conducted on the land for decades. It represents a well preserved example of farming practices in western Lane County. The postal address is 26689 Pickens Road, Eugene, Oregon 97402.

Nine historic buildings, including a 1914 American Craftsman style farmhouse, are on the property. A feeder barn, fruit house and fuel house were built in 1926 and in 1930 a garage and shop, machine shed, and chicken house were constructed. These buildings are in a state of good repair and of original construction. Three other outbuildings on the property are in disrepair but reflect the scale and variety of the agricultural operation. They are a smokehouse, a bee–hive house, and an outhouse. The farmhouse was designed and built by Charles Fitch and the others by his son and daughter in law, Burr Edson and Valley Agnes (Storey) Fitch. Most of the wood for construction of all these buildings was harvested and sawmilled on the property.

The property was heavily timbered on August 9, 1902 when Fitch purchased Lot 5 in Section 3 of Township 18 South, Range West of Willamette Meridian. The harvest and sawmilling of the timber on the property provided material for construction and lumber for sale as well as clearing the land for farming. The farmstead had a wide range of agricultural production, grains and hay were complemented by vegetables and a fruit orchard. Bees were kept to pollinate the fruit and animal husbandry included a large chicken coop as well as several head of cattle and some hogs.

The soil is classed 2E for agricultural use by the United States Department of Agriculture on a scale of 1 to 8 with 1 being most productive. The land lays nearly level to gradual stream terraces and low foothills with elevation varying from

See also
 Historic preservation
 History of agriculture in the United States
 Homestead Acts
 National Register of Historic Places listings in Lane County, Oregon

References

External links
 
 
 

1914 establishments in Oregon
Buildings and structures in Eugene, Oregon
Farms on the National Register of Historic Places in Oregon
Historic districts on the National Register of Historic Places in Oregon
National Register of Historic Places in Eugene, Oregon